Coopertown may refer to:

Places
United States
 Coopertown, Florida in Miami-Dade County, Florida
 Coopertown, Tennessee in Robertson County, Tennessee
 Coopertown, West Virginia in Boone County, West Virginia

See also
 Cooperstown (disambiguation)